Michael Netti is an American basketball coach and former player. Since 2022, he has served as an assistant coach at Ohio State.

He has served as an assistant with Ohio State head coach Chris Holtmann at Gardner-Webb, and later served under him at Gardner-Webb and Ohio State. Before joining Holtmann's staff at Ohio State, he was an assistant coach at East Carolina. He has also been a head coach at Lackawanna College, a NJCAA school in Scranton, Pennsylvania.

Early life and playing career

Netti was born and raised in Liverpool, New York. He played college basketball at Alvernia University (then called Alvernia College) in Reading, Pennsylvania from 1998 to 2000. After the 1999–00 season, he transferred to Syracuse and discontinued his basketball career.

Coaching career

Early career

Netti's first job as an assistant coach was at Gardner-Webb under head coach Rick Scruggs. He was hired as an assistant coach at St. Francis Brooklyn in 2006 and stayed there through 2008.

Lackawanna College

In 2008, he was hired as the head coach at Lackawanna College. He spent two seasons there, winning 43 games in total.

Later career

Netti returned to GardnerWebb in 2010 and spent three seasons there. He served under thenhead coach Chris Holtmann, who was an assistant coach during Netti's first stint at GardnerWebb. In 2013, he was hired by East Carolina to be an assistant coach in the staff of head coach Jeff Lebo.

After four seasons at East Carolina, Netti was hired as a special assistant at Ohio State, where he was reunited once again with Holtmann, who had become the head coach there. In this role, he helped create offensive game plans and worked with players off the court. When Ryan Pedon and Tony Skinn left Ohio State for other opportunities in 2022, Netti was promoted to assistant coach.

Personal life

Netti is married to his wife, Natalie (née Yelton). They have a son named Ryan.

Head coaching record

References

External links
East Carolina Pirates bio
Ohio State Buckeyes bio

Living people
American men's basketball players
Basketball coaches from New York (state)
Gardner–Webb Runnin' Bulldogs men's basketball coaches
East Carolina Pirates men's basketball players
Ohio State Buckeyes men's basketball coaches
Guards (basketball)
Year of birth missing (living people)